La moglie di sua eccellenza is a 1913 Italian film directed by Augusto Genina.

External links 
 

1913 films
Italian silent short films
Films directed by Augusto Genina
Italian black-and-white films